Melville J. Gideon (May 21, 1884, New York City – November 11, 1933, London) was an American composer, lyricist and performer of ragtime music, composing many themes for hit Broadway musicals including The Co-Optimists and The Beauty Spot. He was also a director, producer and performer.

References

External links

1884 births
1933 deaths
American male composers
American musical theatre composers
Songwriters from New York (state)
20th-century American male musicians
American male songwriters